Charles Vallée (born 18 November 1861, date of death unknown) was a French archer.  He competed at the 1908 Summer Olympics in London. Vallié entered the men's Continental style event in 1908, taking 11th place with 193 points.

References

External links
 
 
 Charles Vallée's profile at Sports Reference.com

1861 births
Year of death missing
Archers at the 1908 Summer Olympics
Olympic archers of France
French male archers